Lucky Number Slevin (also known as The Wrong Man in Australia, The Slevin Affair in Spain, Hitman for Hire in Mexico and Check-Mate in Brazil) is a 2006 neo-noir crime thriller film directed by Paul McGuigan and written by Jason Smilovic. The film stars Josh Hartnett, Morgan Freeman, Ben Kingsley, Lucy Liu, Stanley Tucci, and Bruce Willis. It revolves around an innocent man dragged into the middle of a war being plotted by two of New York City's rival crime bosses.

Plot
Two bookies are separately ambushed and murdered by unseen killers. In a bus terminal, a young man is approached by Goodkat, who tells the story of Max and the Kansas City Shuffle: two decades earlier, Max borrowed money from the mob to bet on a fixed horse race, only for the horse to die mid-race.  To set an example to make sure nobody else would try to bet on a fixed race, the mob killed Max, his wife and his young son Henry. Goodkat describes the "Kansas City Shuffle", a misleading double bluff, then tricks and kills the young man, taking the body in a truck.

In New York City, Slevin Kelevra is staying in his friend Nick Fisher's apartment and, upon being visited by Nick's neighbor Lindsey, discusses Nick's disappearance and why his apartment was unlocked. Lindsey suggests that Nick might be missing and, after she leaves, Slevin is kidnapped by two henchmen, who take him to "The Boss". Mistaking Slevin for Nick, The Boss orders him to repay a large gambling debt or kill the son of his rival, "The Rabbi"; The Boss believes The Rabbi is responsible for assassinating his son (seen in the intro), and wants The Rabbi's homosexual son, Yitzchok "The Fairy", to be killed in revenge. Slevin returns to the apartment, but is kidnapped again, this time by two of The Rabbi's Jewish henchmen. Like The Boss, The Rabbi also mistakes Slevin for Nick, and also demands he repay a large gambling debt. Slevin tells The Boss he will kill Yitzchok. Concurrently with Slevin visiting the mob bosses, it becomes apparent Goodkat is somehow involved in both sides and is responsible for Nick's debts being called in, and that he plans to kill Slevin after Yitzchok dies and make it look like they both committed suicide.

Slevin is approached by Detective Brikowski, who is investigating The Boss and The Rabbi. Brikowski has also been informed that Goodkat is back in town for the first time in twenty years and thinks there is a connection between The Boss, The Rabbi, Goodkat, and Slevin. After pretending to be gay, Slevin gets invited to Yitzchok's apartment, where he and Goodkat kill Yitzchok and his bodyguards. The two then kidnap The Boss and The Rabbi, with both waking up restrained in The Boss's penthouse. Slevin appears and explains the overarching twist: Slevin is Henry, the son of the ill-fated Max, and the mobsters who killed Max were The Boss and The Rabbi. Goodkat is revealed as the assassin hired to kill young Henry, who after an attack of conscience took him in and raised him instead. After revealing his identity, Slevin suffocates The Rabbi and The Boss by taping plastic bags over their heads, killing them the same way they killed his father. Since Lindsey earlier photographed Goodkat while investigating Nick's disappearance, Goodkat shoots her to protect his identity.

While Brikowski is hunting for Slevin he gets a phone call from his boss and learns the meaning of the pseudonym Slevin Kelevra: "Lucky Number Slevin" was the horse his father had bet on, and "Kelevra" is Hebrew for bad dog, mirroring Goodkat's name. It is revealed that Brikowski murdered Slevin's mother to pay his own gambling debts twenty years ago. As he hears this story Brikowski resigns himself to his fate as Slevin, showing rage for the first time, appears in Brikowski's backseat and shoots him.

Some time later at the bus terminal Slevin is met by Lindsey, and it is revealed that Goodkat informed Slevin that he had to murder Lindsey because she had a picture of him. However, Slevin explained his true identity to Lindsey and helped fake her death. When Goodkat appears, aware of the deception, Slevin explains he had to save Lindsey and did not think Goodkat would understand. Since Goodkat had saved Slevin as a boy he states that he understands and agrees to leave Lindsey alone. Goodkat gives Slevin back his father's old watch and then disappears into the crowd. The movie flashes back twenty years to when Goodkat first spared young Henry, they drive away and Goodkat turns on the radio to a song titled "Kansas City Shuffle".

Cast

Release

Theatrical
For its US release on April 7, 2006, it was the first movie from The Weinstein Company to be distributed by Metro-Goldwyn-Mayer as part of a three year distribution deal between Weinstein and MGM. The deal was terminated three months early in late 2008.

Home media
The film was released on DVD on September 12, 2006. and on Blu-ray November 8, 2008. To date the film has made $26,877,256 in home video sales, bringing its worldwide total to $83,186,137. This does not include rentals or Blu-ray sales. In addition to Blu-Ray and DVD this was one of the few films to be released on the failed HD-VMD format.

Reception

Box office
Lucky Number Slevin opened in 1,984 theaters in North America and grossed $7,031,921, with an average of $3,544 per theater and ranking #5 at the box office. The film ultimately earned $22,495,466 domestically and $33,813,415 internationally for a total of $56,308,881, above its $27 million budget.

Critical response
Lucky Number Slevin has received mixed reviews. The critical consensus states "Trying too hard to be clever in a Pulp Fiction kind of way, this film succumbs to a convoluted plot, overly-stylized characters and dizzying set design." The film also has a score of 53 out of 100 on Metacritic based on 36 critics indicating mixed or average reviews. Audiences polled by CinemaScore gave the film an average grade of "B+" on an A+ to F scale.

Accolades
Directors Guild of Canada
 Nominated: Outstanding Sound Editing – Feature Film

Milan International Film Festival
 Won: Best Film (Paul McGuigan)
 Won: Best Actor (Josh Hartnett)

Motion Picture Sound Editors, USA
 Nominated: Best Sound Editing for Music in a Feature Film
 Nominated: Best Sound Editing for Sound Effects and Foley in a Foreign Film

References

External links

 
 
 
 
 

2006 films
2006 action thriller films
2006 crime thriller films
2006 thriller drama films
American action thriller films
American crime thriller films
American thriller drama films
American gangster films
American neo-noir films
British action thriller films
British crime thriller films
British thriller drama films
British gangster films
British neo-noir films
Canadian action thriller films
Canadian crime thriller films
Canadian thriller drama films
English-language Canadian films
2000s English-language films
English-language German films
Films directed by Paul McGuigan
Films set in New York City
Films set in Manhattan
Films set in Montreal
Films shot in New York City
Films shot in Montreal
Films about gambling
German action thriller films
Alliance Films films
Metro-Goldwyn-Mayer films
The Weinstein Company films
German crime thriller films
German thriller drama films
2000s American films
2000s Canadian films
2000s British films
2000s German films
Canadian gangster films